"Da Boom" is the third and special episode of the second season of the animated comedy series Family Guy and the tenth episode of the series. It originally aired on Fox in the United States on December 26, 1999. The episode features the Griffin family after a nuclear holocaust occurs, due to Y2K on New Year's Eve. The family then travels in search of food, and eventually decide to establish a town around a Twinkie factory. Peter then takes over the town, establishing himself as mayor, but eventually becomes power hungry, and is overthrown.

The episode was written by Neil Goldman and Garrett Donovan and directed by Bob Jaques. The episode featured guest performances by Patrick Duffy, Victoria Principal, Jack Perkins, Will Sasso, and Joey Slotnick along with several recurring voice actors for the series. This is the first episode that aired to feature Mila Kunis as the voice of Meg Griffin, following Lacey Chabert's departure from the series.

Plot
On December 31, 1999, Quahog prepares for New Year's Day and the new millennium, and the Griffins have been invited to Quagmire's millennium party. At a store, a man wearing a chicken suit asks Peter if he wants a coupon, but Peter refuses, recalling an incident in which he got an expired coupon from Ernie the Giant Chicken, resulting in a destructive fistfight. The man then warns Peter that the world will end because of the Y2K problem, so Peter locks himself and the family in their basement in hazmat suits, despite Lois' objections. Just after midnight, the Y2K bug hits. This causes a worldwide nuclear attack, with vehicles crashing and missiles self-launching, destroying much of the world, and mutating, injuring, or killing most of its inhabitants. The Griffins remain safe, though their house has been severely damaged. Starving, Peter immediately eats all the dehydrated meals, without adding water. Peter recalls that the snack food Twinkies are the only food that can survive a nuclear holocaust, so the family prepares to travel to Natick, Massachusetts, in hopes that the Twinkie factory has survived.

The Griffins' car runs out of gas, so they must walk to Natick. When they get there, there is no factory. Stewie berates Peter for costing them their lives before tripping and getting covered in nuclear waste; his arms soon mutate into tentacles. Upon sunrise, the factory is revealed to still be standing and in perfect condition. Expecting to be able to live off the snack food, they establish the town of New Quahog around the factory, with Peter as mayor. In time, New Quahog becomes a thriving community, complete with houses and wells. However, when Brian points out that New Quahog is a peaceful place with no violence, Peter deems that they are completely defenseless; to the outrage of the citizens, he makes guns using the pipes from the city's irrigation system. Meanwhile, Stewie's body has completely transformed into an octopus, and lays hundreds of eggs.

Despite Peter's insistence that he is fit to remain as mayor, the townspeople throw him out of New Quahog, and his family follows him. The citizens destroy the guns, only to be overpowered by hundreds of newly-hatched Octopus-Stewies, which destroy the city. As the family walks away, oblivious to New Quahog's destruction, they decide to continue to a Carvel factory in Framingham.

In a live action epilogue parodying Dallas, the episode is revealed to have been a dream experienced by Pam Ewing (Victoria Principal); disturbed, she tells her husband Bobby (Patrick Duffy) that she dreamt about a strange episode of Family Guy. Bobby comforts her, but then pauses and asks "What's Family Guy?", and the two turn and look with confusion to the audience.

Production

"Da Boom" was the third episode of the second season of Family Guy, and the first for director Bob Jaques. It first aired on December 26, 1999. The episode was written by writing team Neil Goldman and Garrett Donovan, who had written episodes for the show in the first season including "Mind Over Murder".

This was the first episode to have Mila Kunis providing the voice of Meg Griffin. Lacey Chabert, the original voice of Meg, left the series due to time constraints with her acting role in Party of Five, as well as schoolwork. Kunis won the role after auditions and a slight rewrite of the character, in part due to her performance on That '70s Show. Seth MacFarlane, the show's creator, called Kunis back after her first audition, instructing her to speak more slowly, and then told her to come back another time and enunciate more. Once she claimed that she had it under control, MacFarlane hired her.

This was also the first episode of Ernie the Giant Chicken, an anthropomorphic chicken who serves as a rival to Peter. He has a long, unexpected fight with Peter, which interrupts the main storyline. This has become a running gag, having reappeared in episodes such as "Blind Ambition", "Internal Affairs", "No Chris Left Behind" and "Meet the Quagmires". He is voiced by regular show writer Danny Smith.

In addition to the regular cast, actress Victoria Principal; comedian and actor Will Sasso; reporter, commentator, war correspondent, and anchorman Jack Perkins; voice actor Joey Slotnick; and character actor Patrick Duffy guest starred in the episode. Recurring guest voice actress Lori Alan, writer Danny Smith, and actor Patrick Warburton also made minor appearances.

Cultural references
The episode's live-action epilogue is a reference to an episode of the CBS soap opera Dallas that erased the death of Bobby Ewing (Patrick Duffy), which turned out to be a dream experience by Pamela Ewing (Victoria Principal). Principal and Duffy reprised their respective Dallas roles in a live-action recreation of the shower scene at the end of the episode. Randy Newman appears singing everything he sees in a musical moment. The plot includes references to the Y2K bug. Peter takes away Trix from the Rabbit, which is a reference to commercials for Trix cereal. Chris tells E.T. to run when he thinks Peter is the government coming for him. When travelling to find food they are stopped and there's a reference to Family Feud. Stewie's line, "Game over man! Game over!" is a nod to the science fiction film Aliens. Arriving at the Twinkie factory, Peter uses the same words to describe what he sees that Dr. Ellie Arroway used in Contact when witnessing a celestial event in a foreign galaxy.

Reception
The episode received positive reviews. Ahsan Haque of IGN rated the episode a 10/10, saying "Overall, this episode easily ranks as one of the best episodes in the series. Almost every joke succeeds, and the far-fetched alternate reality storyline thoroughly entertains. Despite the fact that all of the events in the episode are revealed to be a dream, it doesn't take away from the high degree of amusement provided." Tom Eames of entertainment website Digital Spy placed the episode at number sixteen on his listing of the best Family Guy episodes in order of "yukyukyuks" and described it as "classic bonkers Family Guy". He added that the episode was "potentially the first time fans realised this wasn't just a Simpsons ripoff."

References

External links

1999 American television episodes
Family Guy (season 2) episodes
New Year television episodes
Natick, Massachusetts
Fiction set in 1999
Television episodes about dreams
Post-apocalyptic television episodes
Television episodes with live action and animation
Works about gun politics in the United States
Fiction featuring the turn of the third millennium
Cultural depictions of Hillary Clinton
Cultural depictions of Bill Clinton